Ram Sharma (1837–1918) was an Indo-Anglian poet.

Ram Sharma can also refer to:

Academics and poets 
Ram Avatar Sharma (1877–1929), Indian academic
Ram Vilas Sharma (1912–2000), Indian literary critic and poet
Ram Sharan Sharma (1919–2011), Indian historian
Ram Karan Sharma (born 1927), Sanskrit poet

Politicians 
Ram Narayan Sharma (1915–1985), Indian politician
Sadhu Ram Sharma (born 1921), Indian politician, leader of the Indian National Congress
Tulsi Ram Sharma (active 1948–1955), Indian politician
Madho Ram Sharma (active 1967–1977), Indian politician, represented Karnal (Lok Sabha constituency)
Ram Sewak Sharma (born 1955), Indian civil servant
Ram Swaroop Sharma (born 1958), Indian politician
Ram Kumar Sharma (active since 2014), Indian politician
Ram Prasad Sharma (active since 2014), Indian politician

Others 
S. Ram Sharma, Indian director of 1965 Hindi film Shaheed (1965 film) and 1970 Hindi film Yaadgaar
Ram Carlo Sharma, Philippine basketballer